The year 515 BC was a year of the pre-Julian Roman calendar. In the Roman Empire, it was known as year 239 Ab urbe condita . The denomination 515 BC for this year has been used since the early medieval period, when the Anno Domini calendar era became the prevalent method in Europe for naming years.

Events

By topic

Art and architecture
 February 25 – The Second Temple in Jerusalem is completed.
 Euphronios creates the Death of Sarpedon, a red-figure decoration on a calyx krater. It is now in the collection of the Archaeological Museum of Cerveteri.

Births 
 Parmenides, Greek religious philosopher  (d. 450 BC)

Deaths 
Arcesilaus III of Cyrene, the sixth Greek Cyrenaean King, was assassinated in 515 BC
King Liao of Wu (Chinese: 吳王僚), king of the state of Wu in the Spring and Autumn period from 526 to 515 BC, assassinated by Zhuan Zhu in 515 BC
Pheretima (Cyrenaean Queen), wife of the Greek Cyrenaean King Battus III and the last recorded queen of the Battiad dynasty in Cyrenaica
Polycrates, son of Aeaces, the tyrant of Samos from c. 538 BC to 522 BC
Zhuan Zhu, an assassin in the Spring and Autumn period.

References